Synanthedon rhodia is a moth of the family Sesiidae first described by Herbert Druce in 1899. It is known from South Africa.

References

Endemic moths of South Africa
Sesiidae
Moths of Africa
Moths described in 1899